Muhammad Rahadiazli bin Rahalim (born 28 May 2001) is a Malaysian professional footballer who plays as a goalkeeper for Malaysia Super League club Terengganu and the Malaysia national team.

Club career

2021 season
Rahadiazli Rahalim is a Terengganu FC Academy product. He is known for his height and physical ability. He made his Malaysia Super League debut in 2-1 win against Selangor in 2021. He joined the Terengganu starting eleven after chances given by head coach Nafuzi Zain. He suffered an ACL injury that ended his season.

2022 season

After his rehabilitation finished in late 2021,he started training with the first team again. Rahadiazli made his comeback from injury against Selangor in a preseason 2-0 win. Rahadiazli return to league play against Johor Darul Ta'zim.

International career

Under 23
Rahadiazli received a callup and listed among 31 players ahead of SEA Games in Vietnam by Under-23 headcoach Brad Maloney.

Senior team
After his performance in the league, he received a national callup for the senior team from former headcoach Tan Cheng Hoe in March 2021. He received another senior callup in March 2022, ahead of friendlies against Philippines and Singapore from new headcoach Kim Pan Gon, but tested positive for COVID-19.

In September 2022, he received another call up for the King's Cup in Thailand.

Career statistics

Club

International

Honours

Terengganu IV
 Malaysia Youth Cup: 2019

Terengganu
 Malaysia Super League runner-up: 2022
 Malaysia FA Cup runner-up: 2022

Malaysia
 King's Cup runner-up: 2022

References

External links
 

2001 births
People from Terengganu
Living people
Malaysian footballers
Terengganu FC players
Malaysia Super League players
Malaysian people of Malay descent
Association football goalkeepers